In computer science, a lock convoy is a performance problem that can occur when using locks for concurrency control in a multithreaded application.

A lock convoy occurs when multiple threads of equal priority contend repeatedly for the same lock. Unlike deadlock and livelock situations, the threads in a lock convoy do progress; however, each time a thread attempts to acquire the lock and fails, it relinquishes the remainder of its scheduling quantum and forces a context switch.  The overhead of repeated context switches and underutilization of scheduling quanta degrade overall performance.

Lock convoys often occur when concurrency control primitives such as locks serialize access to a commonly used resource, such as a memory heap or a thread pool.  They can sometimes be addressed by using non-locking alternatives such as lock-free algorithms or by altering the relative priorities of the contending threads.

See also 

 Thundering herd problem

References

Concurrency control